"By My Side" is a song recorded by American country music artists Lorrie Morgan and Jon Randall. It was released in April 1996 as the first single from Morgan's album Greater Need.  The song reached No. 18 on the Billboard Hot Country Singles & Tracks chart.

History
Morgan originally recorded the song as a duet with Sammy Kershaw, but Kershaw's label "didn't want to use it". As a result, the chairman of Morgan's label recommended that she record it with Randall instead.

Critical reception
Wendy Newcomer of Cash Box reviewed the single favorably, stating that it was a "charming duet" and "The combination of Morgan’s grit and Randall’s airy tenor make radio fireworks."

Chart performance

References

1996 singles
1996 songs
Lorrie Morgan songs
Jon Randall songs
Male–female vocal duets
Song recordings produced by James Stroud
BNA Records singles